Twin City tractors were built by the Minneapolis Steel & Machinery Company until 1929 when it merged with the Moline Implement Company of Illinois and the Minneapolis Threshing Machine Company of Hopkins, Minnesota.

Twin City tractors were dark gray in color, and had a logo much like the "TC" that the Minnesota Twins baseball club uses. The following is a list of all the models of Twin City tractors made by the Minneapolis Steel & Machinery Company and the specifications for each model according to the Nebraska test reports.

Twin City 12-20

Manufacturer......................................Minneapolis Steel & Machinery Co., Minneapolis, MN
Nebraska test number.................................19
Test date............................................June 3-June 12, 1920
Test tractor serial number...........................12278
Years produced.......................................1919-1926
Serial number range..................................10201-19903
Serial number location...............................brass plate left side front of transmission Number 
Produced......................................approximately 9700
Engine...............................................Minneapolis Steel vertical, valve-in-head
Test engine serial number............................12137
Cylinders............................................4
Bore and stroke (inches).............................4.25x6.00
Rated rpm............................................1,000
Displacement (c.i)...................................340.5
Fuel.................................................kerosene/gasoline
Main tank capacity (gallons).........................23
Auxiliary tank capacity (gallons)....................3
Carburetor...........................................Holley, 1.25-in.
Air cleaner..........................................Bennett
Ignition.............................................Bosch DU4 magneto
Cooling capacity (gallons)...........................7

Maximum brake horsepower tests
PTO/belt horsepower..................................27.93
Crankshaft rpm.......................................1,017
Fuel use (gallons per hour)..........................3.18

Maximum drawbar horsepower tests
Gear.................................................low
Drawbar horsepower...................................18.43
Pull weight (pounds).................................3,476
Speed (miles per hour)...............................1.99
Percent slippage.....................................20.10
SAE drawbar horsepower...............................12
SAE belt/PTO horsepower..............................20
Type.................................................4 wheel
Front wheel (inches).................................steel 34x5.75
Rear wheel (inches)..................................steel 50x12
Length (inches)......................................84 wheel, 134 total
Height (inches)......................................63.50
Rear width (inches)..................................63
Weight (pounds)......................................4,000
Gear/speed (miles per hour)..........................forward 1/2.20, 2/2.93 reverse1/na

See also
List of tractor manufacturers
tractor

References
Dunning, Lorry; Ultimate American Farm Tractor Data Book Nebraska Test Tractors 1920-1960

External links
Twins City Tractors Page
List of tractors at tractordata.com
Youtube of the Canadian 60-90, 1 of 2 left
Youtube of the U.S. 60-90, 2 of 2 left

Tractor manufacturers of the United States